Strotheria is a genus of flowering plants in the tribe Tageteae within the family Asteraceae.

Species
The only known species is Strotheria gypsophila, native to the State of Nuevo León in northeastern Mexico.

References

Tageteae
Monotypic Asteraceae genera
Flora of Nuevo León
Taxa named by Billie Lee Turner